Celtic FC Providenciales is a football club of Turks and Caicos.

They play in the Turks and Caicos first division, the MFL League.

Achievements

Current squad
As for the 2007/2008 season

Football clubs in the Turks and Caicos Islands